An award bestowed by the Paul Robeson Citation Award Committee of the Actors' Equity Association.

Recipients 

 1974: Paul Robeson
 1975: Ossie Davis & Ruby Dee
 1976: Lillian Hellman
 1977: Pete Seeger
 1978: Sam Jaffe
 1979: Harry Belafonte
 1980: Alice Childress
 1981: Studs Terkel
 1982: Ed Asner
 1983: John Henry Faulk
 1984: Lena Horne
 1985: Arthur Mitchell
 1986: Vinie Burrows
 1987: Joe Papp
 1988: Jacques d'Amboise
 1989: Bill Ross & Dr. Margaret Burroughs
 1990: Maya Angelou
 1991: Gordon Parks
 1992: Art D'Lugoff
 1993: Katherine Dunham
 1994: Lloyd Richards
 1995: Gil Noble
 1996: George C. Wolfe
 1997: Athol Fugard
 1998: Leonard de Paul
 1999: Loften Mitchell
 2000: Rosetta LeNoire
 2001: Brock Peters
 2002: Gertrude Jeannette
 2003: Woodie King Jr.
 2004: Judith Jamison
 2005: Carl Harms
 2006: Bill Cosby rescinded
 2007: Mercedes Ellington
 2008: Sidney Poitier
 2009: Micki Grant
 2010: Charles Randolph-Wright
 2011: James Earl Jones
 2012: William Greaves
 2014: Baayork Lee

References

External links

Actors' Equity Association
American theater awards